Suzanne Dracius (born August 25, 1951) in Fort-de-France, in the Terres-Sainville district) is a French writer from Martinique.

Biography 
After studying at the Lycée Marie-Curie in Sceaux and at the Sorbonne, Suzanne Dracius taught in Paris, then at the University of the French Antilles and in the United States as a visiting professor at the University of Georgia and the University of Ohio.

She has made the fight against any kind of racial, sexual or social discrimination the issue and the subject of her writing. Her books  and  have been translated into English as Climb to the Sky and The dancing other, and Italian; also an anthology of poetry, Calazaza's delicious dereliction : poems.

Work

Novels 
 , Seghers, 1989 ; reissued by Editions du Rocher, 2007
 , Desnel, 2003

Short stories 
 , collection of short stories, No. 15), 1992; reprinted in pocket format, 1995.
 , short story, in  under the direction of Aurélien Boivin et de Bruno Dufour, ed. , 2008,

Poetry 
No. 3, 1992; No. 5, 1993
  (collective) Desnel, 2005
  (collective, coordinated by), Desnel, 2006
 , Desnel, 2008
  (collective, coordinated by), Desnel, 2010
 , Idem, 2014
 , éditions Idem, 2016

Plays 
 , fabulodrama, Desnel, 2005; first performed at the prefecture of Fort-de-France in 2000, then the Festival du Marin (2002), revived under the patronage of TV5 at the opening ceremony of the AATF symposium (Association of American Teachers of French) in a production by the author (Trois-Îlets, 2003)

Essays, children's and youth literature and fine books 
  (with Pierre Pinalie), ed. Hugues Hayot, 1994
  (illustrations by Choko), Desnel, 2006
 My Little Book of London /  (bilingual text), Desnel, 2008
 , International Journal of Francophone Studies Volume 11 Numbers 1 and 2, edited by Adlai Murdoch (UIUC) and Jane Kuntz (UIUC), 2008, ed. Intellect Ltd., Bristol, UK
  (collective), L’Harmattan, 2009
 In Search of Suzanne Césaire's Garden », in Research in African Literatures, vol. 41, No 1 (Spring 2010), Indiana University Press, The Ohio State University

Awards and literary prizes 
 1989 :  finalist for the Prix du Premier Roman.
 2003 : Awarded honorary membership of the AATF
 2003 :  was given the "" awarded by FNAC.
 2004 : Awarded honorary membership of the Foreign Language Honor Society of Ohio University.
 2010 :  in recognition of her life's work.
 2019 : .

References 

University of Georgia faculty
Martiniquais writers
Martiniquais poets
20th-century French writers
21st-century French writers
20th-century French poets
21st-century French poets
1951 births
Living people